Greg D'Angelo, (born December 18, 1963) is an American drummer most famous for his work in the band White Lion.

Career

Early career (1981–1984)
Between 1981 and 1983, D'Angelo was a member of Anthrax. After leaving Anthrax, D’Angelo joined Cities. In 1985 he appeared on the Jack Starr Rock the American Way LP.

White Lion (1985–1991)
D’Angelo joined White Lion in 1985, replacing Nicky Capozzi.
The band gained worldwide success with the release of the albums Pride, Big Game and Mane Attraction. In the spring of 1991, after a British tour, the rhythm section of D'Angelo and former White Lion bassist James Lomenzo left due to business discrepancies.

Post-White Lion career (1992–present)
In 1993, both D'Angelo and LoMenzo performed with Zakk Wylde as Lynyrd Skynhead, who upon D'Angelo's departure from the band would become Pride & Glory.
In 1996 D'Angelo joined Orange County band Pirates of Venus and stayed with the band through 1998. He is also a former drummer for the band AntiProduct. In 2010 he Joined Stephen Pearcy's solo band, he recorded the "Smash" album with Pearcy and toured with a Pearcy band until 2018. He also currently works out of his mix studio in Los Angeles and is a counselor at Rock n Roll Fantasy Camp.  Greg is currently a principal with performance group Legends of Classic Rock www.locrband.com www.gregdangelo.com

References

White Lion members
American heavy metal drummers
Living people
1963 births
Anthrax (American band) members
Musicians from Brooklyn
20th-century American drummers
American male drummers
Pride and Glory (band) members
Britny Fox members
American people of Italian descent